Thamnophilus is a genus of antbird in the antbird family, Thamnophilidae. The species in this genus are commonly known as antshrikes. They are insectivores that feed by gleaning prey from foliage and are found in the Neotropics.

The genus Thamnophilus was introduced by the French ornithologist Louis Vieillot in 1816. The name combines the Ancient Greek words thamnos "bush" and philos "loving". The type species was subsequently designated as the barred antshrike.

The genus contains the following species:
 Collared antshrike, Thamnophilus bernardi
 Black-backed antshrike, Thamnophilus melanonotus
 Band-tailed antshrike, Thamnophilus melanothorax
 Barred antshrike, Thamnophilus doliatus
 Chapman's antshrike, Thamnophilus zarumae
 Bar-crested antshrike, Thamnophilus multistriatus
 Chestnut-backed antshrike, Thamnophilus palliatus
 Lined antshrike, Thamnophilus tenuepunctatus
 Black-hooded antshrike, Thamnophilus bridgesi
 Black antshrike, Thamnophilus nigriceps
 Cocha antshrike, Thamnophilus praecox
 Blackish-grey antshrike, Thamnophilus nigrocinereus
 Castelnau's antshrike, Thamnophilus cryptoleucus
 White-shouldered antshrike, Thamnophilus aethiops
 Uniform antshrike, Thamnophilus unicolor
 Upland antshrike, Thamnophilus aroyae
 Plain-winged antshrike, Thamnophilus schistaceus
 Mouse-colored antshrike, Thamnophilus murinus
 Black-crowned antshrike, Thamnophilus atrinucha
 Northern slaty antshrike, Thamnophilus punctatus
 Natterer's slaty antshrike, Thamnophilus stictocephalus
 Bolivian slaty antshrike, Thamnophilus sticturus
 Planalto slaty antshrike, Thamnophilus pelzelni
 Sooretama slaty antshrike, Thamnophilus ambiguus
 Acre antshrike, Thamnophilus divisorius
 Streak-backed antshrike, Thamnophilus insignis
 Amazonian antshrike, Thamnophilus amazonicus
 Variable antshrike, Thamnophilus caerulescens
 Rufous-winged antshrike, Thamnophilus torquatus
 Rufous-capped antshrike, Thamnophilus ruficapillus

References

 
Bird genera
Taxa named by Louis Jean Pierre Vieillot
Taxonomy articles created by Polbot